Wide Awake Club (often abbreviated to WAC) was a children's television series broadcast in the United Kingdom on the breakfast television channel TV-am between 1984 and 1989.

History
Wide Awake Club started on Saturday 13 October 1984, broadcasting for an hour each Saturday morning at 8.30 am as TVAM Flagship kids series. The series was devised by producer Nick Wilson, replacing Data Run and SPLAT which were created by Ragdoll's Anne Wood then as Head of Children's Programmes. The change to Wide awake club was part of the cost cutting by management.

WAC was presented by Arabella Warner, James Baker, Timmy Mallett, Tommy Boyd and Michaela Strachan – all newcomers to television, except Boyd who had previously presented Magpie and Mallett who had presented the Oxford Road Show.

The live programme combined comedy, games, celebrity guests, competitions and viewer interaction. There were also more educational features, including visiting experts such as Carol Vorderman for the science slot, as well as attempts to explain historical and contemporary events like the Cold War. A spelling contest, 'Bonk’n’Boob' was praised by teachers for encouraging children to learn to spell properly. The show also launched the career of Mike Myers, later a major Hollywood star, who made guest appearances with Neil Mullarkey on the show for a brief time, parodying the show's title in his segment "Sound Asleep Club", in which he sported pyjamas and a "bed-head" hairstyle. His roles included making earrings out of spoons, tape and string, as well as making a glass of water in a cookery section.

When Wide Awake Club returned after its summer break on Saturday, 14 September 1985, the series was extended to broadcast for almost two hours from 7.30 am until 9.25 am.

The programme was so successful that it launched two spin-offs: Wacaday, a programme for holiday mornings presented solely by Timmy Mallett (joined by Terry a puppet during its first series and Michaela Strachan for later editions) that became even more successful than its parent, and WAC Extra, a Sunday morning version of the show. Both Wide Awake Club and Wacaday introduced the Wacawave, done by making a 'w', by putting one's thumbs together, and waving.

Meanwhile, Wide Awake Club continued for many years with only minor changes to the format. However, in April 1989 it was relaunched as WAC '90, a longer programme broadcast from Granada's studios in Manchester (as opposed to TV-am's in London). The programme ran until June 1990. However, that was not the end of the Wide Awake Club franchise as Wacaday continued until TV-am lost its franchise in 1992.

Programming  
Jem (1987–late 80's) 
 Transformers - during school holidays, 10 minutes shown each day and continued in the next edition of Wacaday

See also 
 Wide-Awake Club

References

External links
Page at Timmy Mallett's website
Page at Watched It!

1980s British children's television series
1984 British television series debuts
1989 British television series endings
Breakfast television in the United Kingdom
British children's television series
TV-am original programming
English-language television shows